Defending champion Diede de Groot and her partner Yui Kamiji defeated the other defending champion Marjolein Buis and her partner Aniek van Koot in the final, 6–3, 6–4 to win the women's doubles wheelchair tennis title at the 2018 US Open. With the win, Kamiji completed the double career Grand Slam.

Seeds

Draw

Bracket

External links 

 Draw

Wheelchair Women's Doubles
U.S. Open, 2018 Women's Doubles